Carole L. Glickfeld is an American novelist and short story writer.

Life
Glickfeld was born in Brooklyn and grew up in Inwood, Manhattan. She graduated from the City College of New York with a Bachelor's degree in Languages and Literature, and studied English literature at Hunter Graduate School.

She has taught at Interlochen Arts Academy and the University of Washington.

Glickfeld was employed by the Washington State Legislature, the U.S. Congress, and served as Director of the Seattle Mayor’s Office for Senior Citizens.

She lives in Seattle.

Awards
 2002 Washington State Book Award for Swimming Toward the Ocean
 1991 National Endowment for the Arts Literary Fellowship
 1991 Washington State Governor's Arts Award
 1987 Flannery O'Connor Award for Short Fiction

Works

Anthologies

 
Becoming Myself: Reflections on Growing Up Female, ed. Willa Shalit

References

External links
Author's website

People from Brooklyn
American short story writers
City College of New York alumni
University of Washington faculty
Living people
Year of birth missing (living people)
People from Inwood, Manhattan
Writers from Seattle